KVCK (1450 AM) is a radio station broadcasting a classic hits format to the  Wolf Point, Montana, United States, area. The station is owned by WolfTrax Broadcasting, LLC, and features programming from ABC Radio.

History
The station went on the air on 1957-09-01 and celebrated its 50th anniversary in 2007.  The call letters represent the first initial of the last name of three original owners.  The letter 'V' representing Mike Vukelich, 'C' representing Pete Coffey, and the 'K' representing Ed Krebsbach.

Ownership
In April 2007, KVCK was acquired by WolfTrax Broadcasting from Wolf Town Wireless Inc.

References

External links

VCK
Radio stations established in 1957
Classic hits radio stations in the United States
1957 establishments in Montana